Almana is a monotypic genus of planthoppers belonging to the family Dictyopharidae. The only species is Almana longipes.

The species is found in Iberian Peninsula.

References

Dictyopharidae
Auchenorrhyncha genera
Monotypic Hemiptera genera
Hemiptera of Europe
Taxa named by Carl Stål